MS Sea Anatolia is a formercross-channel freight ferry, now owned by Sea Lines.

History
MS European Seaway was the first of four freight ferries ordered by P&O European Ferries in the early 1990s for the Dover to Zeebrugge service. She remained on the route until 2000 when she alternated between the Calais and Zeebrugge routes.

In 2003 she was moved to Dover – Calais full-time after the Zeebrugge service ceased but was laid up at the end of 2003 due to over capacity. Following a refit at A&P, Falmouth in December 2003, she was used as an accommodation vessel for fleet overhauls at Falmouth and listed for sale. In June 2004 she was moved to Birkenhead for further lay up but was withdrawn from the sale list. At the beginning of 2005, it was returned to the Dover to Calais route. Until August 2010 she didn't stray from the Dover to Calais route except for refits and during a short period during March 2006 when she operated six sailings to Zeebrugge after the collapse of a berth at Calais.

In September 2011 she was laid up again, but brought back into service in November 2011 following the SeaFrance suspension. From late April until October 2012, she was chartered to Centrica Renewable Energy as an accommodation vessel for technicians working on the Lynn and Inner Dowsing Wind Farms.  This charter required the addition of lifting equipment, boarding ladders and hull access doors to the exterior of the vessel. She then returned to Dover to Calais service until April 2013, when she was again laid up in Tilbury.

European Seaway conducted its duties as a hotel vessel for a European utility company: RWE when building the Nordsee-Ost offshore wind farm, therefore European Seaway has been chartered after successful audit.

European Seaway returned to the Dover to Calais route for the peak season from the beginning of August 2015 being expected to make eight sailings a day. It supplemented P&O Ferries' existing five ship fleet on Dover to Calais services which makes up to 50 sailings a day.

In 2017, European Seaway visited Northern Ireland for the first time as a refit relief vessel for both European Highlander and European Causeway. As she was built as a freighter, she does not normally carry passengers other than freight drivers, however during her spell operating from Larne in 2017, she carried passengers and cars as well as a limited number of foot passengers.

European Seaway arrived at A&P Falmouth at the end of April 2019 ahead of covering European Highlander and European Causeway from the middle of May 2019. Whilst at Falmouth, her homeport changed from Dover to Limassol in line with the rest of the Dover-based P&O fleet.

This is the third time the vessel has visited a shipyard in the past ten months with a dry dock at Damen, Dunkirk in December 2018 following an extended dry docking and refit between 20 June and 11 July 2018 at Remontowa, Gdańsk.

Whilst at Remontowa, she was stripped back to bare metal and re painted with the then-current P&O livery. During the refurbishment, the interior was refreshed with an additional toilet block added. This was done due to the last stint on the Northern Channel with passengers having to use toilet facilities in unoccupied cabins.

In July 2021, she was moored on the River Fal just north of King Harry Ferry, having been temporarily removed from service due to the COVID-19 pandemic.

In January 2022, she was sold to Sea Lines and renamed Sea Anatolia. In January of that year she left Falmouth under tow for ‘’Yalov’’ for refit, including the installation of a stern ramp and internal ramps between her decks. On 15 February 2022, she was registered under the flag of Panama.

In February 2023, it was rumoured that the ship will be charterted to Maritima Peregar SA, and wlll begin sailing between Malaga, Spain, and Tanger-Med, Morocco, from 6 March 2023.

Sister ships

 (formerly European Pathway)
 (formerly European Highway)

As built the ship was identical to European Highway and European Pathway. The fourth 'European Class' freight ferry was converted to a multi-purpose vessel for the Dover-Calais route and named  though she still retained a number of similarities. European Seaway is now the only member of the class in 'as built' condition following the conversion of European Pathway and European Highway, now  and  respectively, to multi-purpose ships for the Dover-Calais route.

References

Ferries of the United Kingdom
Ferries of France
1991 ships
Ships of P&O Ferries